This is a list of museums in the Grisons, Switzerland.

References

External links 

 Museums of Grisons

 
Museum
 
Grisons